Nevena Tsoneva (born 17 August 1986, in Sevlievo) is a Bulgarian singer who won the first season of the Bulgarian television series Music Idol in 2007.

Biography

Early career
Born Nevena Tsvetanova Tsoneva, she began accompanying her dad to bar and restaurant performances at age six, and soon became a regular on the mic. After winning several awards Nevena recorded her first album at age 13, with the help of her ambitious father.

She conquered "Hit-1" with Christina Aguilera's song "The Voice Within". Two years later she won another contest, "Бургас и Морето"("Burgas and the Sea"), performing the song "Мое Море"("My Sea")- music by Mitko Shterev, lyrics: Lozan Takev. Nevena then recorded a pop-folk album, supported by her dad again. He wrote a song for the young star, called "Молитва за Теб" ("A Prayer for You"), which they often performed together.

Personal life and education
Prior to her musical career, She took Secondary Specialized Education – Organizer of Medium and Small Business, Economics, English, Bulgarian language & Literature, Mathematics, IT, Fine Art at Vasil Levski General Secondary School at her native Sevlievo in 2002–2005, she also took Marketing at St. Cyril and St. Methodius University of Veliko Turnovo in 2005 – 2006 and got her B.A (Bachelor of Arts) with honors at the prestigious International University College – University of Portsmouth Program, Sofia specializing Foundation degree – Business Administration in 2010 – 2011.

Other interests includes photography, drawing and travelling.

Music Idol
As a youngster, Nevena admired the singer Gloria and therefore auditioned for the first season of the Bulgarian TV show Music idol, where Gloria was one of the judges on the panel. At the first audition, Nevena performed "The Voice Within", "Даньова мама", Silvia Katzarova's "Топъл Дъжд" and "Циганска е Душата" a song by Gloria. She then made it to the finals, along with 11 other contestants. She gained an immediate advantage over the others after performing her first song, "Мой Стих" by Neli Rangelova. After a tough music battle, Nevena made it to the last round with competitor Teodor Koychinov. In the end, she won 64% of the votes, thus becoming Bulgaria's first Music Idol.

Song performances on Music Idol

Post-Music Idol

Nevena signed a record deal with Virginia Records (representative of Universal Music Group for Bulgaria), which was the prize as a winner of the Music Idol contest. Her first duet with Slavi Trifonov, a song called "Жестока"("Cruel"), came out some weeks later and became a hit. Her first single "За тебе Песен Нямам" ("I Have no Song for You"), a mix of modern pop and R&B, was released on 28 September 2007. The single debuted on Slavi's show and its video came out a month later. Nevena's first solo album appeared on 16 November 2007 and contained eleven songs, including an English-language version of "За тебе Песен Нямам". Music producer and A&R of the album was Miro Gechev and many of the album's lyrics were written by Rushi Vidinliev.

The Voice of Bulgaria
Seven years after winning the Music Idol Nevena auditions in the third season of The Voice of Bulgaria where she performed the song of Ishtar "Horchat hai Caliptus". Keep going on the show team Miro. She won vocal duel and continues to live concerts.

Song performances on The Voice of Bulgaria

Discography

Albums
 Без страх (Bez Strah, "No Fear") (2007)

Singles
 Жестока – featuring Slavi Trifonov & Ku-Ku Band (Cruel) (2007)
 За тебе песен нямам (For you have no song) (2007)
 Не изчезвай (Do not disappear) (2007)
 Всеки път обиквам те – featuring Teodor Kojchinov (Every time they take to) (2008)
 Името ми – featuring Skiller & Ya-Ya (My name) (2008)
 Zoom (Bad Boys vs. Super Girls) – featuring Marius Moga and NiVo (2009)
 Бяла зима (White winter) (2010)
 Слагам край – Miro ft. Krisko & Nevena (Put an End) (2011)
 Налей, налей – Miro ft. Krisko & Nevena (Pour, pour) (2011)
 Flying with the Wind – Perform the song in the Pixar's animated film – "Brave" (2012)
 All over the Earth – Perform the song in the Pixar's animated film – "Brave" (2012)
 Десет нощи (Ten nights) (2013)
 Самодива (Fairy) (2013)
 Повей, ветре (Blow, wind) (2013)
 Всичко, което искам – featuring Miro (All I want) (2014)
 Когато най-силно ще боли – featuring Milenium X (When most would hurt) (2015)
 Без имена – featuring Svetozar Hristov (Without names) (2015)
 Нарича се живот – (It's called life) (2015)
 Двама – (Two) (2015)

Awards
1999 – Winner in the "Become a Star" – Gabrovo, Bulgaria
2002 – First place in the international festival "Golden Harlequin" – Stara Zagora, Bulgaria
2004 – Winner for March in the "Hit minus one" of Television
2006 – Grand Prize in the "Burgas and the Sea", "Young Artist"
2006 – Grand Jury Prize in the "Burgas and the Sea" with the song "My Sea" (music and arrangement – Mitko Shterev, text – Lausanne Takev)
2007 – Winner of the first edition of the music format "Music Idol"
2008 – Award "Miss Golden stag" at the International Festival "Golden stag" – Brasov, Romania
2008 – Award "BG debut" of the Annual Music Awards "BG Radio"
2008 – Award "BG album" Annual Music Awards "BG Radio"
2008 – Prize "Best Debut" from Annual Television Music Awards "MM"
2008 – Award "BG album" Annual Television Music Awards "MM"
2008 – Award "BG pop music debut in 2007 'Annual Music Awards Television" Fan "
2008 – Award "BG Pop Album of 2007" Annual Television Music Awards "Fan"
2008 – Award "BG pop hit in 2007" Annual Television Music Awards "Fan"
2008 – Award of viewers Annual Television Music Awards "Fan"
2009 – Award "BG artist" Annual Music Awards "BG Radio"

Special performances

2000 – Participant in the "Golden Mustang" – Varna, Bulgaria
2007 – Two concerts for the Bulgarian community in London, England
2007 – special guest – artist in the national tour of Slavi Trifonov and Ku-Ku Band – "We continue"
2008 – participation in "Eurovision Bulgaria" with the song "Beat It" (music-Gechev Miro and Carla Rahal; text – Vanya Shtereva; arrangement – Miro Gechev)
2008 – Guests at the evening show-rated TV Pro TV – "Happy hour", Romania
2008 – Concert for the Bulgarian community in Amsterdam, Netherlands
2009 – Special guest performer in the national tour of Slavi Trifonov and Ku-Ku Band – "No mercy"
2010 – Special guest performer in the show program "People of Fame"
2010 – Concert for the Bulgarian community in Nicosia, Cyprus
 2010 – Special guest in "Slavi's people" show
 2010 – Nevena founded her own music company – "Seventeen”
 2011 – Special guest at the national tour "Summer with FAN TV"
 2012 – Performs the songs "Flying with the Wind" and "All over the Earth" in the Pixar's animated film – "Brave"
 2012 – Special guest-performer at the annual edition of the Vienna Fashion Awards 2012. Along with her performance of "Дельо Хайдутин" and "Даньова мама" young Bulgarian designer Lida Marinkova presented models of glass and acrylic
External

References

External links
 Nevena Tsoneva official site
 Nevena Tsoneva official Facebook fanpage
 
 Nevena Tsoneva official MySpace
 Nevena Tsoneva official Soundcloud
 Nevena Tsoneva iTunes

1986 births
Living people
People from Sevlievo
21st-century Bulgarian women singers
Idols (TV series) winners
Bulgarian pop singers